New Zealand at the 1960 Summer Olympics was represented by a team of 37 competitors, 33 men and four women, who took part in 28 events across nine sports. Selection of the team for the Games in Rome, Italy, was the responsibility of the New Zealand Olympic and British Empire Games Association. New Zealand's flagbearer at the opening ceremony was Les Mills. Harold Austad was the team's Chef de Mission. The New Zealand team finished 14th on the medal table, winning a total of three medals, two of which were gold.

Medal tables

Athletics

Track and road

Field

Cycling

One male cyclist represented New Zealand in 1960.

Track
Men's 1000 m time trial

Equestrian

Jumping

Fencing

One fencer represented New Zealand in 1960.

Field hockey

Men's tournament
Team roster

Group A

Group A tie-breaker

By winning the Group A tie-breaker match, New Zealand advanced to the quarter-finals, while the Netherlands continued to the classification matches for 9th to 12th places.

Quarter-final

After losing its quarter-final, New Zealand moved into the classification matches for 5th to 8th places.

5th–8th Classification matches

New Zealand moved into the playoff for 5th and 6th places by defeating Germany.

The match to decide 5th and 6th positions between Australia and New Zealand was declared null and void after Australia's previous match against Kenya was declared drawn on appeal. Australia subsequently defeated Kenya in a replay, and then a replay was required between New Zealand and Australia to decide 5th place.
5th–6th Classification replay

New Zealand finished the men's field hockey tournament in 5th place.

Rowing

In 1960, seven rowing competitions were held, and New Zealand entered a single rower: James Hill competing in single sculls. The competition was for men only; women would first row at the 1976 Summer Olympics.

Sailing

Helmer Pedersen was a reserve but did not compete.

Weightlifting

Wrestling

Officials
 Chef de Mission – Harold Austad
 Assistant team manager – George Thorn
 Physiotherapist and masseur – Stanley Paris
 Athletics section manager – Joe McManemin
 Field hockey section manager – Jack Squire
 Rowing section manager – Charles Saunders
 Sailing section manager – Hugh Poole
 Weightlifting section manager – John Cullen
 Wrestling section manager – Jack Prestney

References

Nations at the 1960 Summer Olympics
1960
Summer Olympics